Dwight Pond is a small lake east-southeast of Old Forge in Herkimer County, New York. It drains east via an unnamed creek which flows into Limekiln Creek.

See also
 List of lakes in New York

References 

Lakes of New York (state)
Lakes of Herkimer County, New York